The Richmond Post is a newspaper in Richmond, California, featuring comics, world news, regional San Francisco Bay Area news, local city of Richmond news, health, entertainment, and religious or "faith" sections in addition to an advertisements section. The paper has been printed and circulated since 1964. Published weekly, the paper is available in front of businesses throughout Richmond and neighboring North Richmond.

The newspaper is headquartered in downtown Oakland, California. It is one of five local Post Newspapers published by the Post News Group, along with the Oakland Post, the Berkeley Tri-City Post, the San Francisco Post and the South County Post.

On the morning of August 2, 2007, Chauncey Bailey (newly promoted to Editor-in-Chief of all five Post newspapers) was killed as he was walking to his office by a gunman at close range, in what police described as "an assassination".
Witnesses said a single gunman wearing dark clothing and a ski mask
 approached Bailey, shot twice and ran away.

References

External links
Chauncey Bailey Obituary

African-American newspapers
Mass media in Richmond, California
Newspapers published in the San Francisco Bay Area
Weekly newspapers published in California